John Keith Jackson (5 September 1942 – 29 December 2022) was an English footballer who made 656 appearances in the Football League playing as a goalkeeper for Crystal Palace, Leyton Orient, Millwall, Ipswich Town and Hereford United. He also played for St. Louis Stars and California Surf of the North American Soccer League.

Career
Jackson was born in Hammersmith and began his career as a junior with Crystal Palace, signing from St Clement Danes School in March 1962. He also spent time with Brentford as a junior. He was initially understudy to Bill Glazier but when Glazier left in 1964, vied successfully for the goalkeeping position with Tony Millington. He then went on to make 222 consecutive appearances and was ever present in the 1968–69 season which saw Palace reach the top flight for the first time. In the club's subsequent four seasons in the top division Jackson missed only four games. After Palace were relegated in 1973, he moved to Leyton Orient, where he stayed for six years. After that, two years at Millwall was followed by a year with Ipswich, and Jackson finished his career with Hereford United, after 19 years as a goalkeeper. In 1983 he was signed by Brighton & Hove Albion as cover when they reached the FA Cup Final.

His one league appearance for Ipswich was in a high-pressure match against Manchester United, with Ipswich needing to win to stay in with a chance of winning the League Championship. Jackson received a standing ovation at the end of his first top flight match for seven years, having made three important saves in Town's 2–1 win. Ipswich manager Bobby Robson said: "We have paid him a year's salary to make those saves, but it was worth it!"

His nickname, reflecting the Palace supporters' respect for his safe hands, was "Stonewall", inspired by the Confederate general from the American Civil War.

International career
Prior to signing for Crystal Palace Jackson had already won England youth team honours and in March 1971, represented the Football League against the Scottish League.

Later life and death
After retiring from football Jackson had many jobs including working for a golf magazine, then selling golf equipment after which for a time he was goalkeeping coach for Brighton & Hove Albion F.C.; and most recently reported as working as a courier for Lewes (district) council.

Jackson died on 29 December 2022, at the age of 80.

References

1942 births
2022 deaths
Footballers from Hammersmith
English footballers
Association football goalkeepers
Crystal Palace F.C. players
Leyton Orient F.C. players
St. Louis Stars (soccer) players
California Surf players
Millwall F.C. players
Ipswich Town F.C. players
Hereford United F.C. players
English Football League players
North American Soccer League (1968–1984) players
English Football League representative players
Brentford F.C. players
English expatriate footballers
Expatriate soccer players in the United States
English expatriate sportspeople in the United States
People educated at St. Clement Danes School